Kri-Kri, the Duchess of Tarabac is a 1920 German silent comedy film directed by Frederic Zelnik and starring Lya Mara, Johannes Riemann, and Gisela Werbisek. It premiered at the Marmorhaus in Berlin.

Cast
Lya Mara as Kri-Kri
Johannes Riemann
Gisela Werbisek
Wilhelm Diegelmann
Hans Junkermann
Hermann Picha
Helene Voß
Karl Platen
Fritz Schulz
Ernst Behmer

References

External links

Films of the Weimar Republic
Films directed by Frederic Zelnik
German silent feature films
German black-and-white films
Silent comedy films
German comedy films